Donald Duck is a Walt Disney cartoon character.

Donald Duck may also refer to:

Disney comics
 Donald Duck (American comic book), an American comic book, 1952–present
 Donald Duck Weekblad, a Dutch comic book, 1952–present
 Donald Duck (comic strip), a 1938-1995 newspaper comic strip

Other
 Donald Duck (film series), a 1937-1961 short film series
 Donald Duck (orange juice), a brand of orange juice
 DD tank, nicknamed "Donald Duck tanks", a type of amphibious swimming tank
 Donald Duk, a 1991 novel for children written by Frank Chin
 "Donald Duck", a song by Don Patterson with Booker Ervin from the album Hip Cake Walk

See also
 Donald Duck universe
 Donald Duck in comics
 Donald Duck pocket books
 Donald Duck talk
 Donald Duck Party
 :Category:Donald Duck